Norma de la Motte is a former Papua New Guinea international lawn bowler.

Bowls career
De la Motte won a bronze medal in the singles for Papua New Guinea at the 1977 World Outdoor Bowls Championship in Worthing. She was selected for the Championships after winning the National singles and pairs in 1976.

References

Living people
Papua New Guinean female bowls players
Year of birth missing (living people)